The Mirage 30 is a Canadian sailboat, that was designed by American Robert Perry and first built in 1983. The design is out of production.

The boat was built by Mirage Yachts in Canada.

The Mirage 30 design is not related to the Mirage 30 SX, which is instead a development of the Kirby 30.

Design

The Mirage 30 is a small recreational keelboat, built predominantly of fiberglass. It has a masthead sloop rig, an internally-mounted spade-type rudder and a fixed fin keel. It displaces  and carries  of ballast.

The boat has a PHRF racing average handicap of 168 with a high of 178 and low of 165.

See also
List of sailing boat types

Similar sailboats
Alberg 30
Alberg Odyssey 30
Aloha 30
Annie 30
Bahama 30
Bristol 29.9
C&C 1/2 Ton
C&C 30
C&C 30 Redwing
Catalina 30
Catalina 309
CS 30
Grampian 30
Hunter 29.5
Hunter 30
Hunter 30T
Hunter 30-2
Hunter 306
J/30
Kirby 30
Leigh 30
Mirage 30 SX
Nonsuch 30
O'Day 30
Pearson 303
S2 9.2
Seafarer 30
Southern Cross 28

References

External links

Keelboats
1980s sailboat type designs
Sailing yachts
Sailboat type designs by Robert Perry
Sailboat types built by Mirage Yachts